Yulyan Vasilev (born 16 August 1961) is a Bulgarian swimmer. He competed in three events at the 1980 Summer Olympics.

References

1961 births
Living people
Bulgarian male swimmers
Olympic swimmers of Bulgaria
Swimmers at the 1980 Summer Olympics
Place of birth missing (living people)
20th-century Bulgarian people
21st-century Bulgarian people